The Palmerston Forts that defend Dover were built in response to the 1859 Royal Commission dealing with the perceived threat of a French invasion. The forts were intended to defend the Port of Dover, that would provide direct access to an invasion fleet, from capture. Construction was carried out by the Royal Engineers and civilian contractors (under Royal Engineer supervision). In addition to the newly constructed forts, extensive work was carried out on existing fortifications. The fortifications built or upgraded as part of the works were:

Admiralty Pier Turret
Archcliffe Fort
Dover Castle complex, including:
East Demi Battery
Hospital Battery
Shotyard Battery
Shoulder of Mutton Battery
Fort Burgoyne
Langdon Battery
Western Heights complex, including:
Dover Citadel
Citadel Battery
Drop Redoubt
Drop Battery
Grand Shaft Barracks
North Centre Bastion
North Centre Detached Bastion
North Entrance
South Entrance
South Front Barracks
St Martin Battery

Dover